Nora Leticia Rocha de la Cruz (born December 18, 1967 in Monclova, Coahuila) is a retired female track and field athlete from Mexico, who competed in the 5000 and 10,000 metres. She claimed the gold medal in the women's 10,000 metres at the 1999 Pan American Games in Winnipeg, Manitoba, Canada.

Achievements

References

External links
 
 sports-reference

1967 births
Living people
Mexican female long-distance runners
Athletes (track and field) at the 2000 Summer Olympics
Athletes (track and field) at the 1999 Pan American Games
Athletes (track and field) at the 2003 Pan American Games
Olympic athletes of Mexico
Sportspeople from Monclova
Pan American Games gold medalists for Mexico
Pan American Games silver medalists for Mexico
Pan American Games medalists in athletics (track and field)
Central American and Caribbean Games gold medalists for Mexico
Competitors at the 1998 Central American and Caribbean Games
Central American and Caribbean Games medalists in athletics
Medalists at the 1999 Pan American Games
Medalists at the 2003 Pan American Games